Stopsley High School is a co-educational secondary school located in the Stopsley area of Luton, Bedfordshire, England.

History
In September 2002 Stopsley High became a designated specialist sports college. It was re-designated in 2007 with Music nominated as its second subject.

As a part of Building Schools for the Future (BSF) programme the school's capacity was expanded from 990 to 1350.

Previously a foundation school administered by Luton Borough Council, in September 2021 Stopsley High School converted to academy status. It is now sponsored by the Middlesex Learning Trust.

Uniform 
The main colours of the Stopsley High Schools uniform are black and blue. Boys wear black trousers and girls have the option of black trousers or a black skirt. The tie is black and blue with the school logo, but prefects wear special ties with their house logo replacing the school's. The shirt can be accompanied by a black jumper with the Stopsley motif on the left breast.

The Stopsley High School sports kits is all black with the school's logo on it. Students have the option of wearing a t-shirt and shorts or a tracksuit in this style.

Curriculum 
Stopsley High School teaches the following subjects:

Compulsory, all years
Maths, English, Science, PE, PSHE and Philosophy and Ethics

Compulsory KS3, option KS4
French, Spanish, History, Geography, Music, Art, Dance, Ethics
Drama, Construction, Food Tech, DT, ICT

Optional KS4 only
Sociology, Computer Science, BTEC Music, Health & Fitness and BTEC child development

Notable former pupils
 Stacey Dooley  - television presenter and documentary filmmaker
 Monty Panesar -  cricketer who played for Northamptonshire, Sussex, Essex and England
 Bruce Rioch - professional footballer, football manager, Luton Town Football Club, Arsenal Football Club
 Neil Rioch - professional footballer, Luton Town FC, Aston Villa FC, Portland Timbers FC, USA, England Youth international
 Alan Slough - professional footballer, Luton Town FC, Fulham FC
 Rodney Bewes - actor, The Likely Lads

References

External links
Stopsley High School official website
OFSTED Report

Secondary schools in Luton
Academies in Luton